Helium V is an open-source ERP suite. It has been developed by Helium V IT-Solutions GmbH in Austria starting in 2005. The industry of initial focus has been electronic manufacturing. The targeted customers are small and medium-sized companies (SMEs). In this SME context, the evaluation of KPIs is of great importance, so this is very high on the developer's agenda.

The software is available as open-source since October 2010. It is an integral part of the Lisog open-source stack initiative.

Features

Helium V covers the whole process cycle of a company, providing modules for:

 Quotation
 Purchase
 Production planning
 Procurement
 Capacity planning
 Merchandise management (ERP)
 Item master
 Time tracking
 Production
 Delivery
 Post calculation
 Accounting
 Payment management

In practice, the ERP shows a high degree of flexibility and customization opportunities, allowing solutions to be tailored to fit the needs of each company.

Industries

As a result of constant development the ERP-suite has managed to cover all major industries:

 Electrical
 Electronics
 Metal processing
 Mechanical engineering
 Plastics technology
 Food
 Advertising agencies
 Services

Architecture

The system is based on a J2EE architecture. Therefore, it is written in Java, using JBoss as applications server and Postgres as default database. MS-SQL or Oracle are supported on special request. The GUI is written with the Java SWING toolkit. As a result, Helium V runs on any platform which supports Java (Linux, Mac OS X, Windows).

A key feature of the suite is its customizability: For example, the administrator can define the screens, tabs or elements visible for users. The time tracking functionality can already be accessed via an API; more APIs are planned and in development.

Helium V provides multilingual support through Unicode. Languages available as of today are German (Germany/Austria/Switzerland) and English.

Business model

The business model of Helium V is based on the dual licensing model. The open-source edition comes with no warranty or professional support; such services are provided by Helium V IT Systems GmbH (Austria) for the enterprise edition. The developer does, however, provide an open platform to nurture open source engagement.
Hence, community contributions are accepted and appreciated. The contributor has to sign a contribution agreement or provide the source code under a liberal open source license like the MIT license.

Integration
The Helium V development team is interested in a seamless integration with other (open source) components. The first
official integration partner is agorum with the DMS system agorum core.

Co-operations

The developers of Helium V are working closely together with academic institutions in order to improve the quality of the software.

The following universities are supporting the further development of Helium V at the moment:
 Technische Universität Darmstadt, Germany
 University of Applied Sciences Kufstein, Austria

See also

 Agorum Core
 Lisog

References

External links
 Helium V Company Profile on LinkedIn (German)
 Helium V Company Profile on Xing (German)
 Official site for the Business Edition
 Community site for the Open Source Edition (German)
 Community site for the Open Source Edition (English)
 Lisog Homepage

Free ERP software
ERP software
Free business software
Enterprise resource planning software for Linux
Software using the GNU AGPL license